Kevin Peter Steggles (born 19 March 1961) is an English former footballer who played at right-back. He made a total of 90 league appearances in an eight-year career in the Football League.

Career
Steggles began his career at Ipswich Town, who were competing at the top of the First Division in 1980–81 and 1981–82 under the stewardship of Bobby Robson, before dropping to ninth position in 1982–83 after Bobby Ferguson took charge. Steggles contributed to Ipswich's victorious 1980–81 UEFA Cup campaign, making two appearances during the run, including the semi-final second leg. However, he was not part of the squad for the final itself. He was loaned out to Southend United in 1983–84, playing three games at Roots Hall; the "Shrimpers" were relegated out of the Third Division at the end of the season. The "Blues" finished 17th in 1984–85, before suffering relegation in 1985–86. He spent a brief time on loan at Fulham in 1986–87, playing three games at Craven Cottage. He then left Portman Road in February 1987 and spent the rest of the season in the Second Division with West Bromwich Albion, playing 14 league games for Ron Saunders's "Baggies". He joined Third Division Port Vale for 'a small fee' in November 1987 to cover for the injured Alan Webb. He made twenty league and five FA Cup appearances in 1987–88, before losing his place in April after Webb recovered from his injury. Manager John Rudge handed him a free transfer away from Vale Park in May 1988, and Steggles moved on to play for Southern League side Bury Town, and then Eastern Counties League clubs Brantham Athletic, Great Yarmouth, Woodbridge Town, and Felixstowe & Walton United.

Career statistics
Source:

Honours
Ipswich Town
UEFA Cup: 1981

References

1961 births
Living people
People from Ditchingham
English footballers
Association football defenders
Ipswich Town F.C. players
Southend United F.C. players
Fulham F.C. players
West Bromwich Albion F.C. players
Port Vale F.C. players
Bury Town F.C. players
Brantham Athletic F.C. players
Great Yarmouth Town F.C. players
Woodbridge Town F.C. players
Felixstowe & Walton United F.C. players
UEFA Cup winning players
English Football League players
Southern Football League players
Chelmsford City F.C. non-playing staff